Forrest Griffin (born July 1, 1979) is an American retired mixed martial artist and former UFC Light Heavyweight Champion. He was inducted into the UFC Hall of Fame in 2013 and currently serves as the Vice President of Athlete Development at the UFC Performance Institute. Griffin, a former Georgia police officer, first rose to prominence after winning the first season of The Ultimate Fighter. In the tournament finals, he defeated Stephan Bonnar, which is widely credited as sparking the success of the UFC.

Early life
Griffin, who is of Irish descent, graduated from Evans High School in Evans, Georgia, a suburb of Augusta where he played football. He then graduated with a Bachelor of Arts in political science from the University of Georgia. Thereafter, Griffin served as a law enforcement officer for the Richmond County Sheriff's Office in Augusta, Georgia. He also served as a patrol officer with the University of Georgia police.

He trained at The HardCore Gym (now SBG Athens) in Athens for seven years under Adam and Rory Singer. He later left law enforcement to pursue a career in professional mixed martial arts. Griffin is also an MMA instructor at Throwdown Training Center and Robert Drysdale Brazilian jiu-jitsu in Las Vegas, Nevada.

Early mixed martial arts career
Before The Ultimate Fighter, he fought the likes of Jeff Monson, Jeremy Horn, Chael Sonnen and early UFC veteran Dan Severn in his first pro fight. Forrest Griffin is also known for a fight with Edson Paradeo, in which Edson broke Griffin's left arm with what appeared to be a badly blocked roundhouse kick aimed at the body.  Forrest continued on to win the fight by knockout. As a result of the badly blocked body kick, he has a huge permanent lump on his left forearm.

The Ultimate Fighter
Griffin first became well known by taking part in the first-season of Spike TV's The Ultimate Fighter, a mixed martial arts reality show. At the time, he had given up mixed martial arts and taken a job with the Augusta/Richmond County Sheriff's Department in Georgia, but he was persuaded by Dana White to take part in the show.

Griffin vs. Bonnar

On the show, he reached the finals where he defeated Stephan Bonnar by unanimous decision. The fight was credited by Dana White as the "most important fight in UFC history" and the fight that brought the UFC into the mainstream. For winning the competition he was given a six-figure professional contract to fight with the UFC.
The Stephan Bonnar fight was declared the #1 UFC fight of all time in the UFC Ultimate 100 Greatest Fights program.

Rise to fame

Griffin vs. Ortiz
On April 15, 2006, Griffin fought former light heavyweight champion Tito Ortiz at UFC 59, in which he lost a controversial split decision.

Griffin vs. Bonnar II
At UFC 62, Griffin then fought Stephan Bonnar in a rematch from their earlier fight. Griffin won by unanimous decision, sweeping all three rounds.

Griffin vs. Jardine
Griffin was defeated by Ultimate Fighter 2 semifinalist Keith Jardine at UFC 66 by TKO at 4:41 of the first round. After the fight, Griffin sat in his corner crying. Moments later, he walked away from Joe Rogan's attempt to interview him, saying "I don't ev...Keith came in and he did exactly what I wanted to do and he knocked me the fuck out. Let's go home."

Staph infection
Griffin was scheduled to fight at UFC 70 against Lyoto Machida on April 21, 2007 but he was unable to fight due to a staph infection.

Griffin vs. Ramirez
On June 16, 2007 Griffin defeated Hector Ramirez at UFC 72 in Belfast, Northern Ireland via unanimous decision with all three judges scoring the fight 30–27 to Griffin. During the fight, Forrest was able to land 38 leg kicks breaking the UFC record for most leg kicks landed in three five-minute rounds. This record has since been broken by Amir Sadollah, who landed 46 against Peter Sobotta at UFC 122.

Griffin vs. Shogun
At UFC 76, Griffin fought against PRIDE Middleweight Grand Prix Champion Maurício Rua. At the time, Shogun was ranked the number one light heavyweight fighter in the world by several MMA publications. Griffin won by rear naked choke at 4:45 of round three. Griffin required surgery after the fight due to a shoulder injury that was sustained before the bout. Griffin's shoulder has been a recurring problem since.

Coaching The Ultimate Fighter 7
On The Ultimate Fighter 6 finale, Dana White announced that Griffin was not only the number one contender for the Light Heavyweight title, but also one of the coaches for The Ultimate Fighter 7 and would fight the other coach at the end of the series. The other coach, Quinton "Rampage" Jackson was announced by Dana White on December 9 at Spike TV's Video Game Awards show.

On June 20, 2008, Griffin co-hosted the 25 Tuffest Moments in The Ultimate Fighter with Stephan Bonnar and Dana White.

Winning and losing the UFC Light Heavyweight Championship and rematches

Griffin vs. Jackson
On July 5, 2008, Griffin fought the UFC Light Heavyweight Champion, Quinton "Rampage" Jackson. Viewed as a heavy underdog by many going into the fight, Griffin faced Jackson in a hard-fought battle that was named "Fight of the Night" by UFC president Dana White. Griffin won a unanimous decision victory and became the new undisputed UFC Light Heavyweight Champion.

Griffin appeared to be in trouble in the first round after being dropped by an uppercut, but he rallied in the second round and landed a damaging leg kick early that severely wobbled Jackson. Griffin followed up with ground strikes and cemented his control, preventing Jackson from mounting any significant offense for the entire round. After three more back and forth rounds, Griffin would go on to win the fight by unanimous decision to capture the light heavyweight title.

The decision was described as controversial by some commentators. After the fight, Jackson's trainer Juanito Ibarra, unhappy with the judges scoring, expressed plans to protest the unanimous decision with the Nevada State Athletic Commission but never filed as it would not have changed the decision.

Griffin's documented pay for the fight was $310,000. $100,000 to fight, win bonus of $150,000 and $60,000 for the Fight of the Night award.

Griffin vs. Evans
Griffin's first title defense came at UFC 92: The Ultimate 2008, against undefeated challenger Rashad Evans. After Griffin controlled most of the first two rounds with effective striking, Evans caught one of Griffin's kicks and took him down, defeating Griffin by TKO in the third round with ground and pound from inside the champion's guard. The loss was Griffin's third loss since entering the UFC. During the fight Griffin broke his hand, sidelining him for several months.

Griffin vs. Silva
After recovery, Griffin signed on to fight pound-for-pound stalwart Anderson Silva at UFC 101. Griffin was slated to take on Brazilian Thiago Silva, but on April 28, 2009, UFC President Dana White confirmed that he would instead accommodate Anderson's return to the light heavyweight division following his middleweight title defense against Thales Leites at UFC 97. During the bout, Griffin was knocked down three times in the first round by Silva. Before the third knockdown, Griffin charged Silva with a flurry of punches, all of which were avoided by sways from Silva, who then countered with a compact right hand whilst retreating, knocking Griffin out.

After the fight, Griffin got up from the canvas, left the cage, and jogged out of the arena. It was initially suggested that Griffin was rushed to a hospital due to a dislocated jaw and trouble hearing in one ear.  However, it turned out there was no injury to Griffin's jaw.
Both fighters were awarded $60,000 as Fight of the Night bonuses and Silva received an additional $60,000 in bonus money for Knockout of the Night.

Griffin vs. Ortiz II
When Mark Coleman got injured and had to drop out of his matchup against Tito Ortiz, Griffin accepted a rematch against Ortiz at UFC 106. Griffin also wore white and black fight shorts instead of his trademark tan shorts for the fight. Griffin went on to win the gory battle by split decision, showing superior striking skills and a stronger ground game than in their previous fight. After the fight Griffin said, “Tito was a great fight for me to come back, we’ll have to do a third that’s 1-1 man.” With a split decision in both of their fights, Griffin seemed more than willing to get a rubber match put together with Ortiz to settle the score once and for all. “You could tell he was a guy getting ready for Mark Coleman, no offense, and he’s a guy coming off back surgery. We’ll do it again, I won’t break my foot, he’ll be in better shape,” commented Griffin.

Shoulder injury
Griffin was expected to face Antônio Rogério Nogueira on May 29, 2010 at UFC 114, but Griffin pulled out of the fight due to a shoulder injury. He was replaced by Jason Brilz.

Griffin vs. Franklin
Griffin faced former UFC Middleweight Champion Rich Franklin on February 5, 2011 at UFC 126. Griffin controlled the majority of the fight: in the first round he took Franklin down and controlled him on the ground and in the second he used superior kicks and combinations to knock Franklin down. Griffin went on to win by unanimous decision.

Griffin vs. Shogun II
A rematch with Maurício Rua took place on August 27, 2011 at UFC 134. Griffin lost the bout via KO (punches) in the first round and would be out up to 6 months with possible right-foot and jaw injuries.
Before the fight, Griffin was updated that his wife had gone into labor.  Dana White also voiced his support for Griffin, stating that he was very proud of him regardless of the loss.

Griffin vs. Ortiz III
Griffin faced Tito Ortiz for a third time on July 7, 2012 at UFC 148. He won the fight via a 29-28 unanimous decision out-striking Ortiz 2:1 despite being knocked down by Ortiz as well as being taken down twice.  The fight also won Fight of the Night earning both Griffin and Ortiz a fight bonus.

This fight marked the third time in his career that he left the Octagon on unusual terms, simply walking out before the fight results were read. He later went back to the ring and gave Tito Ortiz an unexpected  interview.

MCL & ACL injury
Griffin was expected to fight Chael Sonnen in a rematch on December 29, 2012 at UFC 155. Instead Sonnen was pulled out of the fight to coach TUF season 17. Griffin was then expected to face Phil Davis at the event. However, on December 5 it was announced that Forrest was forced out of the bout due to an MCL tear and ACL strain.

Griffin hoped to return from injury by the end of 2013.

Retirement and UFC Hall of Fame
On May 26, 2013, it was announced at the post-event news conference for UFC 160 that Griffin had retired from MMA fighting, citing chronic injuries as the reason for his decision. After the announcement of Griffin's retirement, Dana White announced that Griffin and Stephan Bonnar would be inducted into the UFC Hall of Fame on July 6. Griffin has remained in the sport, and is currently working as the vice president of athlete development at the UFC Performance Institute.

Personal life
Griffin and his longtime girlfriend Jaime Logiudice were married on September 18, 2009. The couple welcomed their first child, a daughter, in September 2011. Forrest's wife was going into labor (nine days early) as he competed against Maurício "Shogun" Rua at UFC 134 on August 27, 2011.

Championships and awards

Mixed martial arts
Ultimate Fighting Championship
UFC Hall of Fame (Modern-Era Wing) and (Fight Wing) vs. Stephan Bonnar at The Ultimate Fighter 1 Finale
UFC Light Heavyweight Championship (One time)
The Ultimate Fighter: Light Heavyweight Tournament Winner
Fight of the Night (Five times) vs. Tito Ortiz (x2), Quinton Jackson, Rashad Evans, and Anderson Silva
Submission of the Night (One time) vs. Maurício Rua
Wrestling Observer Newsletter
2005 Fight of the Year vs. Stephan Bonnar on April 9
2008 Fight of the Year vs. Quinton Jackson on July 5
Fighting Spirit Magazine
2006 Fight of the Year vs. Tito Ortiz on April 15 
Triumph United
2007 Upset of the Year vs. Maurício Rua on September 22

Mixed martial arts record

|-
| Win
| align=center| 19–7
| Tito Ortiz
| Decision (unanimous)
| UFC 148
| 
| align=center| 3
| align=center| 5:00
| Las Vegas, Nevada, United States
| 
|-
| Loss
| align=center| 18–7
| Maurício Rua
| KO (punches)
| UFC 134
| 
| align=center| 1
| align=center| 1:53
| Rio de Janeiro, Rio de Janeiro, Brazil
| 
|-
| Win
| align=center| 18–6
| Rich Franklin
| Decision (unanimous)
| UFC 126
| 
| align=center| 3
| align=center| 5:00
| Las Vegas, Nevada, United States
| 
|-
| Win
| align=center| 17–6
| Tito Ortiz
| Decision (split)
| UFC 106
| 
| align=center| 3
| align=center| 5:00
| Las Vegas, Nevada, United States
| 
|-
| Loss
| align=center| 16–6
| Anderson Silva
| KO (punch) 
| UFC 101
| 
| align=center| 1
| align=center| 3:23
| Philadelphia, Pennsylvania, United States
| 
|-
| Loss
| align=center| 16–5
| Rashad Evans
| TKO (punches)
| UFC 92
| 
| align=center| 3
| align=center| 2:46
| Las Vegas, Nevada, United States
| 
|-
| Win
| align=center| 16–4
| Quinton Jackson
| Decision (unanimous)
| UFC 86
| 
| align=center| 5
| align=center| 5:00
| Las Vegas, Nevada, United States
| 
|-
| Win
| align=center| 15–4
| Maurício Rua
| Submission (rear-naked choke)
| UFC 76
| 
| align=center| 3
| align=center| 4:45
| Anaheim, California, United States
| 
|-
| Win
| align=center| 14–4
| Hector Ramirez
| Decision (unanimous)
| UFC 72
| 
| align=center| 3
| align=center| 5:00
| Belfast, Northern Ireland, United Kingdom
| 
|-
| Loss
| align=center| 13–4
| Keith Jardine
| TKO (punches)
| UFC 66: Liddell vs. Ortiz
| 
| align=center| 1
| align=center| 4:41
| Las Vegas, Nevada, United States
| 
|-
| Win
| align=center| 13–3
| Stephan Bonnar
| Decision (unanimous)
| UFC 62: Liddell vs. Sobral
| 
| align=center| 3
| align=center| 5:00
| Las Vegas, Nevada, United States
| 
|-
| Loss
| align=center| 12–3
| Tito Ortiz
| Decision (split)
| UFC 59: Reality Check
| 
| align=center| 3
| align=center| 5:00
| Anaheim, California, United States
| 
|-
| Win
| align=center| 12–2
| Elvis Sinosic
| TKO (punches)
| UFC 55
| 
| align=center| 1
| align=center| 3:22
| Uncasville, Connecticut, United States
| 
|-
| Win
| align=center| 11–2
| Bill Mahood
| Submission (rear-naked choke)
| UFC 53
| 
| align=center| 1
| align=center| 2:18
| Atlantic City, New Jersey, United States
| 
|-
| Win
| align=center| 10–2
| Stephan Bonnar
| Decision (unanimous)
| The Ultimate Fighter 1 Finale
| 
| align=center| 3
| align=center| 5:00
| Las Vegas, Nevada, United States
| 
|-
| Win
| align=center| 9–2
| Edson Paredao
| KO (punch)
| Heat FC 2: Evolution
| 
| align=center| 1
| align=center| 1:04
| Natal, Rio Grande do Norte, Brazil
|
|-
| Loss
| align=center| 8–2
| Jeremy Horn
| KO (head kick)
| IFC: Global Domination
| 
| align=center| 2
| align=center| 3:40
| Denver, Colorado, United States
| 
|-
| Win
| align=center| 8–1
| Chael Sonnen
| Submission (triangle choke)
| IFC: Global Domination
| 
| align=center| 1
| align=center| 2:25
| Denver, Colorado, United States
|
|-
| Win
| align=center| 7–1
| Ebenezer Fontes Braga
| Submission (rear-naked choke)
| Heat FC 1: Genesis
| 
| align=center| 1
| align=center| N/A
| Natal, Rio Grande do Norte, Brazil
| 
|-
| Win
| align=center| 6–1
| Steve Sayegh
| TKO (submission to punches)
| KOTC 20: Crossroads
| 
| align=center| 1
| align=center| 1:45
| Bernalillo, New Mexico, United States
| 
|-
| Win
| align=center| 5–1
| Travis Fulton
| TKO  (doctor stoppage)
| CC 1: Halloween Heat, ISCF Sanctioned
| 
| align=center| 1
| align=center| 5:00
| Atlanta, Georgia, United States
| 
|-
| Win
| align=center| 4–1
| Jeff Monson
| Decision (unanimous)
| WEFC 1: Bring It On, ISCF Sanctioned
| 
| align=center| 4
| align=center| 4:00
| Marietta, Georgia, United States
| 
|-
| Win
| align=center| 3–1
| Kent Hensley
| Submission (triangle choke)
| Battle at the Brewery, ISCF Sanctioned
| 
| align=center| 1
| align=center| 2:26
| Atlanta, Georgia United States
| 
|-
| Win
| align=center| 2–1
| Jason Braswell
| Decision (split)
| RSF 7: Animal Instinct
| 
| align=center| 3
| align=center| 4:00
| Lakeland, Florida, United States
| 
|-
| Win
| align=center| 1–1
| Wiehan Lesh
| Submission (rear-naked choke)
| Pride and Honor
| 
| align=center| 1
| align=center| N/A
| South Africa
| 
|-
| Loss
| align=center| 0–1
| Dan Severn
| Decision (unanimous)
| RSF 5: New Blood Conflict, ISCF Sanctioned
| 
| align=center| 3
| align=center| 4:00
| Augusta, Georgia, United States
|

Pay-per-view bouts

Books
Griffin is the author of two books, 2009's Got Fight?: 50 Zen Principles of Hand-to-Face Combat and 2010's Be Ready When The Shit Goes Down: A Survival Guide to the Apocalypse, which both received positive reviews.

Filmography

Films

Television

Video games

See also
List of current UFC fighters

References

External links

UFC Profile
Griffin's Second Book

The Ultimate Fighter winners
1977 births
American male mixed martial artists
Light heavyweight mixed martial artists
Mixed martial artists utilizing Brazilian jiu-jitsu
Mixed martial artists from Ohio
Mixed martial artists from Georgia (U.S. state)
American practitioners of Brazilian jiu-jitsu
People awarded a black belt in Brazilian jiu-jitsu
Living people
Sportspeople from Augusta, Georgia
Sportspeople from Columbus, Ohio
Ultimate Fighting Championship champions
University of Georgia alumni
People from Evans, Georgia
People from Columbia County, Georgia
Ultimate Fighting Championship male fighters